Gordon Edward Corbould, KC (November 2, 1847 – August 19, 1926) was a Canadian lawyer and Conservative politician. In an 1890 by-election triggered by the death of the incumbent MP Donald Chisholm, he was chosen to represent New Westminster in the House of Commons of Canada. He was re-elected once, and sat in the house until 1896.

Born in Toronto, Ontario, the son of Charles and Mary Corbould, Corbould was educated at the Upper Canada College. He was admitted to practice in Ontario in 1872 and practice law in Orillia, Ontario. He moved to New Westminster, British Columbia in 1880 and was called to the bar of British Columbia in 1882.

References
 
 

1847 births
1926 deaths
Lawyers in British Columbia
Conservative Party of Canada (1867–1942) MPs
Members of the House of Commons of Canada from British Columbia
People from Old Toronto
Politicians from Toronto
Canadian King's Counsel